Schloss Beck (Beck Castle) is a Baroque castle in Bottrop, Germany, planned and built as a “maison de plaisance” between 1766 and 1777 by Johann Conrad Schlaun. It is currently run as an amusement park.

History
Although the building was designed as a palatial residence, by the end of the 18th century Beck Castle had become a distillery for schnaps. It came into the possession of the Metternich family around 1850.

Despite the Second World War the castle remained intact, and in 1958 the Hibernia Mining Society bought the property. However, Hibernia was only interested in the grounds, and offered the castle building to all interested parties for free. Because of the responsibility and the expense of maintaining it, nobody wanted to acquire it until 1966, when a certain Karl Kuchenbäcker bought it. Because of years of neglect, the castle had to be completely restored, and to provide money for the restoration Kuchenbäcker opened it to the public.

Following Kuchenbäcker's death (on 28 December 2004), his family put the castle and amusement park up for sale. It is now a protected historical monument.

The amusement park

Beck Castle is very popular with people in the surrounding area, especially for children from 3 to 14 years, because this small theme park is not well known and is rarely overcrowded. For the locals, it is a place to go with the family to enjoy the peace and quiet and to let the children play safely. The park management offers Christmas parties and weddings in large public rooms, as well as nightly dances and recitations. Beck's moated castle, which is  a baroque architectural monument in Westphalia, include a haunted cellar.

The attractions include:

 Wendy house
 Bumper cars
 Adventure simulator
 Trampolines
 Horse-drawn carriages
 A diorama with 1000 moving figures in the castle
 A haunted basement
 Railroad
 Nature studies path
 Cart track
 Playground
 Big wheel
 Swing boats
 Electric race track for horses
 Places for barbecues
 Paddle and rowing boats
 Carousel with aeroplanes
 Roller coaster

References

External links
  Schloss Beck web page

Amusement parks in Germany
Buildings and structures in Bottrop
Palaces in North Rhine-Westphalia
Tourist attractions in North Rhine-Westphalia
Baroque architecture in Germany
Houses completed in 1777